Tori Alamaze (born July 7, 1977) is an American singer best known as a backing vocalist for the hip hop duo OutKast.

Hailing from Detroit, Alamaze worked as a make-up artist for about 10 years, including work for musicians Faith Evans, Erykah Badu, TLC, Xscape, Monica, Outkast, and Busta Rhymes. After her first recording deal, she worked in the studio on her debut album and opened for The Black Eyed Peas.

Alamaze was briefly signed to Universal Records as a solo artist. Her first single, "Don't Cha" (2004), was written and produced by Cee-Lo Green. After mediocre national success, only peaking at No. 53 on the Billboard R&B Singles Chart, Alamaze's label dropped her, and the track was re-recorded by The Pussycat Dolls including a rap from Busta Rhymes. The new version climbed to No. 2 on the Billboard Hot 100 and the Club mix version peaked at No. 1 on the Hot Dance Music/Club Play chart.

Discography
Magick, Blessings & Bullsht Vol. 2 (2022)
Magick, Blessings & Bullsht Vol. 1 (2021)

Singles

Notes

References

External links
 allhiphop.com article:  by Clover Hope
Tori Alamaze at MySpace.com

1977 births
American soul singers
American dance musicians
Living people
21st-century American singers